Fox Chapel Area School District is a public school district located in Allegheny County, Pennsylvania. It serves the boroughs of Aspinwall, Blawnox, Fox Chapel, and Sharpsburg, along with Indiana and O'Hara Townships.  It is located approximately 12 miles from downtown Pittsburgh. The district has four elementary sites, a middle school, and high school. There are approximately 4,600 students enrolled in the school district.

Schools
Fox Chapel Area High School
Dorseyville Middle School
Fairview Elementary School
Hartwood Elementary School
Kerr Elementary School
O'Hara Elementary School

Enrollment
As of October 2017, all schools within the school district have a total of 4,008 students enrolled, with demographics as follows:

As of April 2022, all the schools had 4,156 students enrolled with enrollment per school as follows:

No demographic data was provided in the recent time period.

SAT Testing  
Average scores on the SAT for the Fox Chapel Area High School Class of 2021: 

 Evidence-based reading and writing: 611
 Math: 618

279 members (88%) of the FCAHS Class of 2021 took the SAT during their junior or senior year.

Staff Statistics  
Number of Professional Staff: 

 Elementary: 165
 Secondary: 186

Master's or Doctorate Degrees or Equivalent: 

 Elementary: 75%
 Secondary: 81%

Average Years of Teaching Experience: 

 Elementary: 17 years
 Secondary: 21 years

Awards  
The district has received both national and state recognition. 

 All six schools have been named National Blue Ribbon Schools, and two schools, Fox Chapel Area High School and Fairview Elementary School, received the designation twice. 
 In 2016, the district was one of only 19 new school districts nationwide accepted into Digital Promise’s League of Innovative Schools. 
 Fox Chapel Area School District consistently receives an “A+ Overall Niche Grade” from Niche and is ranked among the top 50 school districts in the nation. 
 The district has been named among the “Best Communities for Music Education” from the National Association of Music Merchants for the past eight years. 
 In 2017, the district was honored by the College Board with placement on the 7th Annual AP District Honor Roll, a distinction for districts that show significant gains in student access and success on Advanced Placement courses and tests. 
 The high school was recognized for Programs of Distinction in Visual Arts in 2015 and received Exemplary Educational Program Credentials in music and school counseling from the Middle States Association Commissions on Elementary and Secondary Schools. 
 Dorseyville Middle School was named Pennsylvania Don Eichhorn Schools: Schools to Watch school. 
 Fox Chapel Area High School has been awarded Silver Medal rankings by U.S.News & World Report during the past decade and is consistently ranked among the nation’s top high schools by Newsweek. 
 FCAHS was included in The Washington Post’s America’s Most Challenging High Schools in 2017.

External links 
Fox Chapel Area School District Website

 

School districts in Allegheny County, Pennsylvania
Education in Pittsburgh area
School districts established in 1958